Bakacak Dam is a dam in Çanakkale Province, Turkey, built between 1991 and 1999.

See also
List of dams and reservoirs in Turkey

External links
DSI

Dams in Çanakkale Province
Dams completed in 1999
1999 establishments in Turkey